Systemic Therapy in Advancing or Metastatic Prostate Cancer: Evaluation of Drug Efficacy (STAMPEDE) is a clinical trial investigating treatments for high risk or terminal prostate cancer. Recruitment started in 2005 and ends in 2022 and in January 2020, over 10,000 participants have joined the trial.

Name

STAMPEDE is an acronym for "Systemic Therapy in Advancing or Metastatic Prostate Cancer: Evaluation of Drug Efficacy".

Aims and procedure
The trial investigates new approaches for men with metastatic and locally advanced prostate cancer.  117 hospitals in the UK and Switzerland are involved with over 10,000 men are expected to take part in the trial.

The men are randomly assigned to one of a number of "arms".  The primary outcome by which the arms were judged is overall survival.

The following arms are documented in the publicly available literature.

Arm A
Standard of care (SOC) is lifelong androgen deprivation therapy (ADT).  After 2015 SOC was expanded to include docetaxel and radiotherapy (RT) at the start of treatment.

Arm B
SOC plus zoledronic acid.

Arm C
Standard care plus docetaxel and prednisolone.

Arm D
SOC plus celecoxib.

Arm E
SOC plus zoledronic acid and docetaxel.

Arm F
SOC plus zoledronic acid and celecoxib.

Arm G
SOC plus abiraterone acetate and prednisolone.

Arm H
SOC plus RT.

Arm J
SOC plus abiraterone and enzalutamide and prednisolone.

Arm K
SOC plus metformin.

Arm L
SOC with transdermal oestradiol replacing standard ADT.

Results
 reported that "the addition of docetaxel to standard  of care was associated with improved survival, with an HR of 0·78 and a difference in median survival of 10 months, as well as improvements in  prostate-cancer-specific  survival,  failure-free  survival, and skeletal-related events". They also noted that docetaxel plus zoledronic acid "was associated with similar improvements, although the benefit observed was smaller".

 reported on radiotherapy.  For patients with a high metastatic burden the radiotherapy did not improve survival.  No improvement was noted for unselected patients, but for men with a low burden overall survival did improve.  There is some discussion as to how the burden is identified (CT and bone scans versus PET).  The findings may also be applicable to other cancers where there is a small volume.

 presents the main findings as:
 adding docetaxel to hormone therapy improves the length of time men live – this is called overall survival
 adding abiraterone to hormone therapy improves overall survival and delays the time until the cancer gets worse
 adding radiotherapy to hormone therapy in men with less prostate cancer spread improves overall survival
 celecoxib doesn’t help men live longer.

See also
 Prostate Adenocarcinoma: TransCutaneous Hormones (PATCH)

References

Bibliography

External links 
 STAMPEDE website

Prostate cancer
Clinical trials